John Edward Fox (born September 1, 1996) is an American football punter for the Detroit Lions of the National Football League (NFL). He played college football at Rice.

Early life and high school
Fox was born in Dallas, Texas and grew up in St. Louis, Missouri. He attended Ladue Horton Watkins High School, where he played baseball and football. As a senior, he was named first-team All-State as a punter and to the second-team as a placekicker while also passing for 1,900 yards and 18 touchdowns at quarterback.

College career
Fox was both a kicker and punter for four seasons at Rice University. As a freshman he handled kickoffs and made 12 of 12 extra point attempts and one of two field goal attempts. He became the Owls punter going into his sophomore year and was named honorable mention All-Conference USA after punting 75 times for 3,051 yards (40.7 average) with two extra points and one field goal made. As a junior, Fox had 56 punts for 2,480 yards (44.3 average) with one extra point attempted and made and was named second-team All-Conference USA. He also became the primary kicker for Rice as a senior and was named first-team All-conference and the Conference Special Teams Player of the Year, as well as a finalist for the Ray Guy Award, after punting 80 times 3,636 yards (45.5 average) with 23 extra points attempted and making 5 of 12 field goal attempts.

Professional career

Kansas City Chiefs
Fox was signed by the Kansas City Chiefs as an undrafted free agent on May 4, 2019. He was waived during final roster cuts. Fox was re-signed by the Chiefs to their practice squad on October 30, 2019, after the team's punter, Dustin Colquitt, suffered a quad strain but was released one week later on November 6.

Detroit Lions
Fox was signed to the Detroit Lions practice squad on December 5, 2019, where he spent the rest of the season. He was signed to a futures contract at the end of the season. Fox was named the Lions opening day punter at the end of training camp, beating out Arryn Siposs. Fox made his NFL debut on September 13, 2020, in the season opener against the Chicago Bears, punting 4 times for 197 yards (49.3 average) with two punts inside the 20-yard line. Fox was named the NFC Special Teams Player of the Month for September.

Fox finished his first season with 59 punts for an average of 49.1 yards and a net average of 44.8, both Lions records, and was named to the 2021 Pro Bowl and second-team All-Pro. He was given an exclusive-rights free agent tender by the Lions on March 4, 2021. He signed the one-year contract on April 23.

On October 22, 2022, Fox signed a three-year, $11.325 million contract extension with the Lions, making him the highest-paid punter in the league.

Personal life
In the 2021 off-season, Fox organized a young specialist camp where he invited youth kickers and punters from the Detroit area.

References

External links
Rice Owls bio
Detroit Lions bio

Living people
American football punters
Rice Owls football players
Players of American football from Missouri
Detroit Lions players
1996 births
National Conference Pro Bowl players